Ali Haidar VC (21 August 1913 – 15 July 1999) was a Pashtun recipient of the Victoria Cross, the highest and most prestigious award for gallantry in the face of the enemy that can be awarded to British and Commonwealth forces.

Details
He was 31 years old, and a Sepoy in the 6th battalion 13th Frontier Force Rifles, in the British Indian Army during World War II when the following deed took place for which he was awarded the VC.

On 9 April 1945 near Fusignano, Italy, at the start of the Allied spring 1945 offensive Haidar's battalion was tasked with a difficult assault crossing of the Senio River. Only Sepoy Ali Haidar and the two other men of his section managed to get across under heavy machine-gun fire. Then, Without orders, and on his own initiative, Sepoy Ali Haidar, leaving the other two to cover him, charged the nearest post which was about 30 yards away. He threw a grenade and almost at the same time the enemy threw one at him, wounding him severely in the back. In spite of this he kept on and the enemy post was destroyed and four of the enemy surrendered. With utter disregard of his own wounds he continued and charged the next post in which the enemy had one Spandau and three automatics, which were still very active and preventing movement on both banks. He was again wounded, this time in the right leg and right arm. Although weakened by loss of blood, with great determination Sepoy Ali Haidar crawled closer and in a final effort raised himself from the ground, threw a grenade, and charged into the second enemy post. Two enemy were wounded and the remaining two surrendered.

Taking advantage of the outstanding success of Sepoy Ali Haidar's dauntless attacks, the rest of the Company charged across the river and carried out their task of making a bridgehead. Sepoy Ali Haidar was picked up and brought back from the second position seriously wounded. The conspicuous gallantry, initiative, and determination combined with a complete disregard for his own life shown by this very brave Sepoy in the face of heavy odds were an example to the whole Company. His heroism had saved the rest of the company. With the rapid advance which it was possible to make the Battalion captured 3 officers and 217 other ranks and gained their objectives. The rest of the company were then able to cross the river and establish a bridgehead.

Further information
He was born in Kohat to Pashtun, Bangash parents, in what is now Khyber Pukhtunkhwa Province, Pakistan. He later achieved the rank of Naib Subedar in his parent battalion, 6th Royal Battalion 13th Frontier Force Rifles which later redesignated as 1st Battalion (Scinde) The Frontier Force Regiment. His VC is on display in the Lord Ashcroft Gallery at the Imperial War Museum, London. On 9 April 2017 the Mayor of Lugo di Romagna Davide Ranalli unveiled a Memorial dedicated to VC Ali Haidar upon the Senio River western bank in the vicinity of Sabbioni area. The ceremony was attended by Brigadier Yogi Sheoran, Defence Wing Attaché of the Indian Embassy in Rome.

Official citation
The official citation for Haidar's award, published in the London Gazette in July 1945 reads:

See also
List of Indian Victoria Cross recipients

Awards and decorations

References

External links
Ali Haider
Burial location of Ali Haider "Pakistan"

1913 births
1999 deaths
Indian World War II recipients of the Victoria Cross
British Indian Army soldiers
People from Kohat District
Pashtun people